The Ecological Party of Uzbekistan (O'zEP) is a political party and environmental movement in Uzbekistan. It was founded on 2 August 2008 as the Ecological Movement of Uzbekistan, and re-inaugurated as a formal political party in January 2019 in advance of expected electoral reforms.

Before the 2019 reforms, fifteen of the 150 seats in the Legislative Chamber of Uzbekistan (the lower chamber of the Oliy Majlis) had been reserved for the movement under the revised electoral law of 2008. Its legislators were elected at a congress held in conjunction with the 2009–10 Uzbek parliamentary election. One legislator was elected from each territorial subdivision of Uzbekistan (the Republic of Karakalpakstan, provinces, and the city of Tashkent), plus one member from the Executive Committee of the Central Council of the Ecological Movement. Delegates to the congress were elected in equal numbers at the conferences of each of the territorial branches of the Ecological Movement.

Electoral history

Presidential elections

Legislative Chamber elections

References

External links 
 Official website

2008 establishments in Uzbekistan
Uzbek
Green political parties
Political parties established in 2008
Political parties established in 2019
Political parties in Uzbekistan